Michael "Ibo" Cooper (born 1952) is a Jamaican reggae musician and musical educator. He was member of the pop-band Inner Circle and founding member of the reggae band Third World. Third World was originally formed in 1973 by keyboardist Michael "Ibo" Cooper and guitarist/cellist Steven "Cat" Coore. Both had received formal training at different music schools run by their aunt and mother respectively in Jamaica, and both had played around the Kingston reggae scene before joining the original lineup of Inner Circle around 1968, when they left to form their own band in 1973. They took Inner Circle's drummer Carl Barovier and lead singer Milton "Prilly" Hamilton. Colin Leslie was recruited from outside to be the bassist but was quickly replaced by Richard 'Richie' Daley. Barovier was replaced shortly after by Cornell Marshall. The  group made its live debut that year at a stage show at the Carib Theater during Jamaica's Independence Celebration. They played around the Kingston club scene and made a name for themselves as one of the few fully self-contained bands around. He has also appeared with reggae artist Burning Spear.

He currently teaches full-time as head of the Caribbean, Latin American and jazz department (Popular Music Studies) at the Edna Manley College of the Visual and Performing Arts in Kingston, Jamaica.

References

External Links
 

Jamaican reggae musicians
Living people
1952 births
People from Clarendon Parish, Jamaica